Baume-les-Dames is a commune in the Doubs department in the Bourgogne-Franche-Comté region in eastern France.  The French mineralogist and chemist Jacques-Joseph Ébelmen (1814–1852), the writer and poet Charles-Émilien Thuriet (1832–1920) and the archaeologist Gustave Fougères (1863–1927) were all born in Baume-les-Dames.

Population
In 1972 the former commune of Champvans-les-Baume was absorbed by Baume-les-Dames.

See also
 Communes of the Doubs department

References

External links

 Official website 

Communes of Doubs